Dynomiella is a genus of beach flies in the family Canacidae. All known species are Afrotropical.

Species
D. australica Mathis, 1996
D. cala (Cresson, 1934)
D. glauca (Wirth, 1956)
D. spinosa (Wirth, 1956)
D. stuckenbergi (Wirth, 1956)

References

Canacidae
Schizophora genera